QAF FC is a professional football club based in Bandar Seri Begawan, Brunei. The club won the Brunei League in 2006 when the DPMM FC had to withdraw because they play in the Malaysian Premier League, thus the QAF FC won the title. Their captain was Riwandi Wahit

Achievements
Brunei League: 3
 2006, 2008, 2010

Brunei League Cup: 2
 2007–08, 2009

Brunei Super Cup: 2
 2007, 2008

Asian Gold cup: 1
 2011–12

They recently Plays as a Brunei national football team side in the 2010 AFC Challenge Cup qualification in Sri Lanka.

Sponsors
Brunei Shell

Kit sponsors
1999–06: FELDOME Sport
2014: Lotto

Current squad

References

Football clubs in Brunei